Value Line, Inc. is an independent investment research and financial publishing firm based in New York City, New York, United States, founded in 1931 by Arnold Bernhard. Value Line is best known for publishing The Value Line Investment Survey, a stock analysis newsletter that is among the most highly regarded and widely used independent investment research resources in global investment and trading markets, tracking approximately 1,700 publicly traded stocks in over 99 industries.

The "Value Line" defined
The "Value Line" was a line representing a multiple of cash flow that Bernhard would visually "fit" or superimpose over a price chart. This was a pioneering attempt to normalize the value of different companies. He soon began publishing his investment survey. Bernhard published The Evaluation of Common Stocks in 1959.

In 1946 Bernhard hired Samuel Eisenstadt, a brilliant and modest young man fresh out of the Army, as a proofreader. Eisenstadt was a graduate of Baruch College who majored in statistics. In 1965 Eisenstadt convinced Bernhard to use a statistical method called ordinary least squares (OLS) regression analysis to replace Bernhard's visual method of fitting cash flow to a price chart. Using scores of Monroe mechanical calculators and a handful of data operators, Bernhard and Eisenstadt produced a stock picking system so successful that it caught the attention of the famed academician Fischer Black of the University of Chicago. Black validated the system's results when he published his famous article in the Financial Analysts Journal, "Yes, Virginia, There Is Hope: Tests of the Value Line Ranking System" in 1973. The system came to be known as the "Value Line Ranking System for Timeliness". With Eisenstadt on board, Bernhard continued to expand the business, adding the other publications and mutual funds along the way. In May 1983, Value Line sold stock for the public for the first time, though the Bernhard family retained 80% control.

Bernhard died in December 1987, but until his death, Bernhard continued his literary interests by combining with W. H. Auden, Jacques Barzun and Lionel Trilling in founding the Mid-Century Book Society.

Shortly after his death, his daughter, Jean Buttner, was named CEO of Value Line.

Fraud case
Fraud was uncovered by the Securities and Exchange Commission (SEC) in November 2009. The fraud, which spanned nearly 20 years and involved over $24 million, was committed by Value Line against its mutual fund shareholders. The fraud was first reported to the SEC in 2004 by the then Value Line Fund portfolio manager and Chief Quantitative Strategist, John (Jack) Dempsey of Easton, Connecticut, who was required to sign a Code of Business Ethics as required by the Sarbanes-Oxley Act. Restitution totaling $34 million was placed in a fair fund and returned to the affected Value Line mutual fund investors.  The Commission ordered Value Line to pay a total of $43,705,765 in disgorgement, prejudgment interest and civil penalty, and ordered CEO Jean Buttner and COO David Henigson to pay civil penalties of $1,000,000 and $250,000, respectively. The Commission further imposed officer and director bars and brokerdealer, investment adviser, and investment company associational bars (“Associational Bars”) against Buttner and Henigson. No criminal charges were filed.

See also
 List of finance topics
 Value Line Composite Index
 Morningstar, Inc.
 American Association of Individual Investors
 Sarbanes–Oxley Act

References

External links
http://www.valueline.com/About/History.aspx
http://www.crainsnewyork.com/article/20091207/FREE/912079992
http://www.marketwatch.com/story/more-lumps-of-coal-for-naughty-mutual-funds-2009-12-20
http://www1.excite.com/home/careers/company_profile/0,15623,182,00.html
http://www.marketwatch.com/story/value-line-showing-the-door-to-its-hidden-genius
http://www.crainsnewyork.com/article/20091129/FREE/311299993

Investment management companies of the United States
Financial economics
Companies listed on the Nasdaq
American companies established in 1931
Financial services companies established in 1931